Tillandsia rothii is an epiphytic bromeliad native to Mexico. It was first described by Werner Rauh in 1976. It can grow quite large and colorful.

Cultivars 
 Tillandsia 'Amigo'
 Tillandsia 'Bahia'
 Tillandsia 'Pacific Sunset'

References

BSI Journal V28(6), Tillandsia Rothii Rauh retrieved 3 October 2011

External links
BSI Genera Gallery photos

Flora of Mexico
Plants described in 1976
rothii